Kim Na-young (Hangul: 김나영; born 18 March 1991) is a South Korean female badminton player.

Achievements

BWF International Challenge/Series
Mixed Doubles

 BWF International Challenge tournament
 BWF International Series tournament
 BWF Future Series tournament

References

External links 
 

1991 births
Living people
South Korean female badminton players